David Murray Lyon (November 22, 1938 – May 9, 2013) was a Canadian Olympic track and field coach.

References

2013 deaths
Canadian sports coaches
1938 births